Una Noche en Madrid (Eng.: A Night in Madrid) is a live album released by  Marco Antonio Solís on June 10, 2008. This album was recorded at the Palacio Municipal de Congresos in Madrid Spain, on October 12, 2007 and became the eight number-one set on the Billboard Top Latin Albums for Solís, tying the record for most number-one albums on the chart with Luis Miguel.

Track listing 

All songs written and composed by Marco Antonio Solís

DVD

 DVD also contains photo gallery.

Personnel 
The information from Allmusic.

 Marco Antonio Solís — Producer
 Mayte Aragon — Producer, video producer
 Carlos Garcia — Producer, video producer
 Chris Bellman — Mastering
 Benny Faccone — Recording, mixing
 Tom Syrowski — Mixing assistant
 Victor Aguilar — Percussion, segundo
 Fidel Arreygue — Bass

 Fernando Cruz — Trombone, metal section
 Emilio García — Drums
 Antonio González — Trumpet
 Luis León — Trombone, metal section
 Rodolfo Luviano — Keyboards, direction
 Martin Serrano — Guitar, keyboards
 Arturo Solar — Choir director
 Estanis Núñez — Photography
 Adriana Rebold —  Graphic design

Chart performance

Sales and certifications

References 

Spanish-language live albums
2008 live albums
Live video albums
2008 video albums
Marco Antonio Solís live albums
Marco Antonio Solís video albums
Fonovisa Records live albums